Pulmonoscorpius is an extinct genus of scorpion from the Mississippian (Early Carboniferous) of Scotland. It contains a single named species, Pulmonoscorpius kirktonensis. It was one of the largest scorpions to have ever lived, with the largest known individual having an estimated length exceeding 70 cm (28 inches). Pulmonoscorpius retains several general arthropod features which are absent in modern scorpions, such as large lateral eyes and a lack of adaptations for a burrowing lifestyle. It was likely an active diurnal predator, and the presence of book lungs indicate that it was fully terrestrial.

Discovery 

Fossils of Pulmonoscorpius kirktonensis have been found at the East Kirkton Quarry, West Lothian in Scotland. Rock layers exposed at the quarry date back to the Carboniferous, specifically the Viséan and Serpukhovian stages of the Mississippian (Early Carboniferous) subperiod, around 336.0 – 326.4 million years ago. The name derives from "Latin pulmonis, a lung, and Greek skorpios, a scorpion." The species name "kirktonensis" refers to the East Kirkton Quarry.

Pulmonoscorpius was described in 1994 based on 16 complete specimens and over 300 additional fragments from East Kirkton. In each specimen, only the outer layer of hyaline cuticle is preserved, estimated to only be 15-18 μm thick in the largest specimen. Scorpion cuticle is present in the East Kirkton Limestone (lower exposed unit) and Little Cliff Shale (middle exposed unit), but not the Geikie Tuff (upper exposed unit). Although cuticle could be found in a variety of shale and carbonate facies, it is most easily prepared out of finely-laminated limestone, which can be dissolved away with dilute hydrochloric acid while leaving the organic cuticle unharmed. Almost all material is completely flattened, so three-dimensional reconstructions are mostly hypothetical.

Description  

The diet of Pulmonoscorpius is not known directly, but it is probable that it preyed on smaller arthropods, and small tetrapods (new arrivals).

The only portions preserved were the outer portions of the cuticle.

Dorsal surface 
Pulmonoscorpius possess two pairs of eyes on the prosoma (the head and legs segment, also known as a cephalothorax). These include a pair of anterior-positioned median eyes (near the center of the prosoma) and a pair of compound lateral eyes (on the edge of the prosoma), with each lateral eye bearing between 40 and 60 lateral ocelli. In modern scorpions, lateral eyes are strongly reduced, but those of Pulmonoscorpius are large, similar to other basal scorpions and most other arthropods. The prosoma is covered by a carapace (a large plate).

The prosoma is followed by a mesosoma (the broad portion of the abdomen-like opisthosoma), which has seven segments each covered by a tergite (smaller, broad plate). The surface of the carapace and tergites are relatively smooth in juveniles, while tuberculated in larger individual.

The metasoma (tail) has five segments, not counting the bulbous telson (stinging segment) at the end. The last (5th) metasomal segment does not exceed the length of the preceding (4th) metasomal segment. Metasomal segments are boxy and ornamented by paired carinae (tuberculated ridges) in adults. The strongest carinae are the dorsal (upper) pair, and superior lateral (upper part of the side), inferior lateral (lower part of the side), and inferior median (underside) carinae are also present. Sexual dimorphism may be present in Pulmonoscorpius, as some specimens (females?) have wider metasomal segments. 

In Pulmonoscorpius kirktonensis, the vesicle (venom-bearing portion of the telson) has pair of strong carinae on its underside. One unique juvenile specimen is observed to lack these carinae, and may belong to a separate species (Pulmonoscorpius sp. A).

Ventral structures 
The coxae of each leg (the shortest segment, closest to the body) converge along the underside of the prosoma. The sternum (ventral plate between the bases of legs 3 and 4) is characteristically elongated, with a Y-shaped sulcus at the rear.

The underside of the mesosoma possessed a bilobed and laterally elongated genital operculum (a covering of the gonopore), followed by pectines (comb-like sensory appendages) with 150-160 narrow teeth, and finally ventral plates (3 in juveniles and 4 in adults). In juveniles, the first ventral plate has a unique median lobation. As with modern scorpions, four pairs of book lungs were present at the corresponding ventral plates.

Appendages 
Like other scorpions, Pulmonoscorpius had four pairs of walking legs as well as larger pincer-like pedipalps and smaller pincer-like chelicerae (mouthparts). One characteristic trait of Pulmonoscorpius is the presence of a long spur on each of the apophyses (an extension of the coxa).

The chelicerae and legs were noted be to be similar to those of extant scorpions, except that the coxa and femur (first and third segments) in legs 3 and 4 are less elongated, and the tibia (fifth segment) of these legs are elongated to about the same length as their femur. In the pedipalps, the femur and patella (fourth segment) are lined with carinae.  Setae (hairs) are sparse and clustered, particularly in larger individuals. Setae density is highest on the large (fixed) finger of the pedipalps. One juvenile specimen has 30% more setae on its fixed finger than any other Pulmonoscorpius kirktonensis specimen. This specimen may belong to a separate species (Pulmonoscorpius sp. B).

Aside from the type species, two other specimens were noted to possibly be distinct, one with "juvenile pedipalp fingers with 30% more setal follicles" than P. kirktonensis and one "lacking tuberculateventral carinae on vesicle of telson."

References

External links 

 https://web.archive.org/web/20061023072618/http://www.langsfossils.com/museum/pages/m-scld-002.htm
 http://dml.cmnh.org/1999Jun/msg00432.html
 Images of the holotype fossil at GB3D

Prehistoric scorpions
Paleozoic arachnids
Carboniferous arthropods of Europe
Carboniferous arachnids
Viséan life
Carboniferous Scotland
Fossils of Scotland
Fossil taxa described in 1994